Heinz-Georg Baus (25 February 1934 – 10 May 2016) was a German billionaire, the owner of the home improvement retail chain Bauhaus AG.

Early life
Baus was born in Heidelberg, Germany on 25 February 1934. Baus trained as a carpenter.

Career
Baus opened the first Bauhaus store in Mannheim in 1960. There are now 250 stores and 17,000 employees in 17 countries across Europe.

Personal life
He was married with one son, Bernd Baus, who is a managing director at Bauhaus. He lived in Monaco.

Baus died on 10 May 2016.

References

1934 births
2016 deaths
German billionaires
Businesspeople from Heidelberg
German expatriates in Switzerland
German company founders
20th-century German businesspeople
21st-century German businesspeople